The 2020–21 Cruz Azul season was the 61st season in the football club's history and the 57th consecutive season in the top flight of Mexican football. Cruz Azul competed in Liga MX and Champions League.

Kits

Players

Squad information

Transfers

In

Pre-season and friendlies

Copa por México

Group stage

Knockout stage

Competitions

Overview

Liga MX

Torneo Apertura

League table

Results summary

Results round by round

Matches

Quarter-finals

Semi-finals

Torneo Clausura

League table

Results summary

Result by round

Matches

Quarter-finals

Semi-finals

Final

CONCACAF Champions League

Round of 16

Quarter-finals

Semi-finals

Squad statistics

Goalscorers
Includes all competitive matches.

Notes

References

External links

Mexican football clubs 2020–21 season
Cruz Azul seasons
Cruz